G.I.R.L. is a all-female team of teenage superheroes appearing in American comic books published by Marvel Comics. The team first appears in Unstoppable Wasp #2 (April 2017) and was created by writer Jeremy Whitley and Elsa Charretier.

History
After mentioning S.H.I.E.L.D.'s list of most intelligent humans that listed women no higher than 27th,  Wasp (Nadia van Dyne) was prompted to start Geniuses In action Research Labs, an enterprise to assess female scientific minds and convince S.H.I.E.L.D. that their list was outdated and in need of revision.

Wasp enlisted the help of Edwin Jarvis to form G.I.R.L. In New York City, she recruited Tai and Lexi Miranda in the Washington Heights neighborhood of Manhattan. Wasp next went to the Lower East Side and spoke with Moon Girl but she was too busy to commit to the project herself. Wasp recruited Shay Smith into G.I.R.L.'s ranks from Brownsville neighborhood of Brooklyn. Wasp finally met with the last name on her list, Priya Aggarwal; however, the young woman stated she wasn't interested. Priya soon changed her mind She Wasp saved her mother from Poundcakes and Letha of the Grapplers.

Early Mission

Wasp's Red Room partner, Ying Lui was sent to capture and bring Nadia back to Red Room. Wasp managed to emotionally connect with Ying and attempted to recruit Ying to join G.I.R.L., Ying revealed the presence of the bomb in her skull and her seemingly demise.

G.I.R.L. had their fist mission to remove the bomb from Ying's head before Wasp turn herself over Red Room. G.I.R.L. managed to save both Wasp and Ying. Ying later joined G.I.R.L. and started dating Shay.

References